Inayat Ullah is a Pakistani professional wrestler. He won bronze at the 2022 Commonwealth Games.

Career 
He won bronze at the 2018 Summer Youth Olympics.

References

Pakistani male sport wrestlers
Living people
2001 births
Commonwealth Games bronze medallists for Pakistan
Commonwealth Games medallists in wrestling
Wrestlers at the 2022 Commonwealth Games
Wrestlers at the 2018 Summer Youth Olympics
Medalists at the 2018 Summer Youth Olympics
Youth Olympic bronze medalists for Pakistan
Sportspeople from Peshawar
Medallists at the 2022 Commonwealth Games